Marcel Ulehla is a Slovak professional ice hockey player who played with HC Slovan Bratislava in the Slovak Extraliga.

References

External links

Living people
HC Slovan Bratislava players
Prince Albert Raiders players
Year of birth missing (living people)
Slovak ice hockey centres
1986 births
Ice hockey people from Bratislava
Slovak expatriate ice hockey players in the Czech Republic
Slovak expatriate ice hockey players in Canada
Slovak expatriate sportspeople in Norway
Slovak expatriate sportspeople in France
Expatriate ice hockey players in France
Expatriate ice hockey players in Norway